The year 2004 is the 8th year in the history of the Pride Fighting Championships, a mixed martial arts promotion based in Japan. 2004 had 10 events beginning with, Pride 27 - Inferno.

Title fights

Debut Pride FC fighters

The following fighters fought their first Pride FC fight in 2004:

 Akihiro Gono
 Amar Suloev
 Bertrand Amoussou
 Brady Fink
 Charles Bennett
 Cory Peterson
 Crosley Gracie
 Dean Lister
 Egidijus Valavicius
 Fabio Mello
 Gan McGee
 Henry Miller
 Hiroyuki Abe
 Jadyson Costa
 James Thompson

 Jens Pulver
 Jin O Kim
 Jorge Patino
 Josh Barnett
 Katsuhisa Fujii
 Kazuo Misaki
 Kazuo Takahashi
 Luiz Firmino
 Makoto Takimoto
 Mal Foki
 Marcus Aurelio
 Mark Hunt
 Masakazu Imanari
 Matt Foki

 Mu Bae Choi
 Rulon Gardner
 Ryo Chonan
 Ryuki Ueyama
 Ryuta Sakurai
 Sean Sherk
 Sergey Ignatov
 Soa Palelei
 Stefan Leko
 Takanori Gomi
 Yasuaki Miyazono
 Yasuhito Namekawa
 Yoji Anjo
 Yukio Kawabe

Events list

Pride 27: Inferno

Pride 27: Inferno was an event held on February 1, 2004 at Osaka-jo Hall in Osaka, Japan.

Results

Pride FC: Bushido 2

Pride FC: Bushido 2 was an event held on February 15, 2004 at the Yokohama Arena in Yokohama, Japan.

Results

Pride FC: Total Elimination 2004

Pride FC: Total Elimination 2004 was an event held on April 25, 2004 at the Saitama Super Arena in Saitama, Japan. This event consisted of the first round of the 2004 Heavyweight Grand Prix. It took place on April 25, 2004, at the Saitama Super Arena in Saitama, Japan. The Grand Prix tournament continued with Pride: Critical Countdown 2004 and concluded with Pride: Final Conflict 2004.

Results

Pride 2004 Heavyweight Grand Prix bracket

Pride FC: Bushido 3

Pride FC: Bushido 3 was an event held on May 23, 2004 at the Yokohama Arena in Yokohama, Japan.

Results

Pride FC: Critical Countdown 2004

Pride FC: Critical Countdown 2004 was an event held on June 20, 2004 at the Saitama Super Arena in Saitama, Japan.

Results

Pride 2004 Heavyweight Grand Prix bracket

Pride FC: Bushido 4

Pride FC: Bushido 4 was an event held on July 19, 2004 at the Nagoya Rainbow Hall in Nagoya, Japan.

Results

Pride FC: Final Conflict 2004

Pride FC:  Final Conflict 2004 was an event held on August 15, 2004 at the Saitama Super Arena in Saitama, Japan.

Results

Pride 2004 Heavyweight Grand Prix bracket

1 The tournament finals initially occurred at Final Conflict, but ended in a no-contest doctor's stoppage and were rescheduled for Pride: Shockwave 2004.

Pride FC: Bushido 5

Pride FC: Bushido 5 was an event held on October 14, 2004 at the Osaka Castle Hall in Osaka, Japan.

Results

Pride 28: High Octane

Pride 28: High Octane was an event held on October 31, 2004 at the Saitama Super Arena in Saitama, Japan.

Results

Pride FC: Shockwave 2004

Pride FC:  Shockwave 2004 was an event held on December 31, 2004 at the Saitama Super Arena in Saitama, Japan.

Results

See also
 Pride Fighting Championships
 List of Pride Fighting Championships champions
 List of Pride Fighting events

References

Pride Fighting Championships events
2004 in mixed martial arts